The Kwannon of Okadera (German: Die Kwannon von Okadera) is a 1920 German silent film directed by Carl Froelich and starring Lil Dagover and Werner Krauss. Produced by Erich Pommer of Decla-Bioscop it was shot at the Babelsberg Studios in Berlin and premiered in the city's Marmorhaus.

Cast
In alphabetical order
 Max Adalbert 
 Albert Bennefeld 
 Lil Dagover as Kwannon  
 Robert Forster-Larrinaga as Georg, Harlanders Sohn  
 Hanna Gath 
 Ernst Gronau
 Leonhard Haskel 
 Hans Junkermann 
 Werner Krauss as Harlander, Grossindustrieller  
 Margarete Kupfer 
 Alexander Köckert 
 Nils Landberg 
 Marija Leiko as Ingele von Geortz  
 Paul Morgan 
 Alice Reppert 
 Karl Römer
 Lillibel Schroth 
 Walter Supper 
 Otto Treptow 
 Alina von Mielewska 
 Elsa Wagner 
 Emmy Wyda

References

Bibliography
 Hardt, Ursula. From Caligari to California: Erich Pommer's life in the International Film Wars. Berghahn Books, 1996.

External links
 

1920 films
Films of the Weimar Republic
Films directed by Carl Froelich
German silent feature films
German black-and-white films
Films shot at Babelsberg Studios
Silent drama films
German drama films